The women's 4 × 400 metres relay event at the 1995 Summer Universiade was held on 3 September at the Hakatanomori Athletic Stadium in Fukuoka, Japan.

Results

References

Athletics at the 1995 Summer Universiade
1995